The Lincoln Battalion was the 17th (later the 58th) battalion of the XV International Brigade, a mixed brigade of the International Brigades also known as the Abraham Lincoln Brigade. It was organized by the Communist International and named after President Abraham Lincoln who led the US during the American Civil War.

The Lincoln Battalion was formed by a group of volunteers from the United States who served in the Spanish Civil War as soldiers, technicians, medical personnel and aviators fighting for Spanish Republican forces against the Nazi-supported forces of General Francisco Franco and his Nationalist faction. The Lincoln Battalion integrated white and black volunteers on an equal basis. Of the approximately 3,015 volunteers from the US, 681 were killed in action or died of wounds or sickness.

History

Creation

The Spanish Civil War was fought from July 17, 1936, to April 1, 1939, between the Republicans, who were loyal to the Spanish Republic, and the Nationalists, a rebel movement led by General Francisco Franco.

On July 26, just eight days after the revolt had started, an international communist conference was held at Prague to arrange plans to help the Republican Government. It decided to raise an international brigade of 5,000 men and a fund of 1 billion francs. At the same time communist parties throughout the world quickly launched a full scale propaganda campaign in support of the Popular Front. The Communist International immediately reinforced its activity sending to Spain its leader Georgi Dimitrov, and Palmiro Togliatti the chief of the Communist Party of Italy. From August onward aid started to be sent from Russia, over one ship per day arrived at Spain's Mediterranean ports carrying munitions, rifles, machine guns, hand grenades, artillery and trucks. With the cargo came Soviet agents, technicians, instructors and propagandists.

The Communist International immediately started to organize the International Brigades with great care to conceal or minimize the communist character of the enterprise, in the line of the Popular Front, and make clear the campaign was on behalf of progressive democracy. In keeping with Popular Front culture, the Americans named their units the Abraham Lincoln Battalion, the George Washington Battalion, and the John Brown Battery. Other countries used names like   "Garibaldi" in Italy. One hundred twenty-five American men and women also served with the American Medical Bureau as nurses, doctors, technicians, and ambulance drivers.

1937
Seeking assistance in combating the armed rebellion, the Republicans asked for volunteer fighters from all over the world. Americans volunteered and arrived in Spain in 1937. Utilizing the name of Abraham Lincoln, the communist supporting men from the US formed the Lincoln Battalion, organized in January 1937 as part of the XV International Brigade. The Lincoln Battalion initially fielded three companies, two infantry and one machine gun. Included were sections of Latin American and Irish volunteers, organized as the Centuria Guttieras and the Connolly Column, respectively. After less than two months of training, the Lincolns went into action in February 1937. Many of the volunteers recalled that training as, "They give me a gun and they give me 100 bullets and they send me to fight."

The International Brigade were usually deployed as shock troops, and as a result they suffered high casualties. By the end of the war the Lincoln Battalion had lost 22.5% of its strength.

The Lincolns suffered heavy losses during the Battle of Jarama. On February 27, 1937, the unit lost two-thirds of its strength, including their commander, Robert Hale Merriman (who was badly wounded), in a futile assault on Nationalist positions. Merriman had begged Lieutenant Colonel Vladimir Ćopić (described as "rather inept") not to launch the attack fearing slaughter. Ćopić insisted it proceed and promised air and armoured support, which never came. Merriman was almost immediately wounded and the Battalion suffered 136 deaths. The battalion remained in combat and was slowly rebuilt while maintaining its front-line positions. The unit was finally pulled out of the lines for a brief rest before the offensive at Brunete.

Joined by the newly trained George Washington Battalion, the XVth Brigade went into action at Villanueva de la Cañada on the second day of the Brunete Offensive, and secured the town after hard fighting. The Washingtons attacked the north end of the village, while the British and Dimitrov battalions attacked from the south.

The XVth Brigade then deployed against "Mosquito Ridge", but, despite repeated assaults, they were unable to dislodge the Nationalist troops holding that key piece of terrain. The Lincoln's commander, Oliver Law, was killed during this action. The XVth Brigade again sustained heavy losses, and, due to the high rate of casualties, the Lincoln and Washington Battalions were merged. Thereafter, the unit was officially known as the Lincoln-Washington Battalion, though it was more commonly referred to as the Lincoln Battalion.

During August, September and October the Lincoln-Washington Battalion fought in a series of battles in the Aragon Offensive. It fought well at both Quinto and Belchite. The engagement at Quinto was a combined arms action as the Lincoln-Washington Battalion was led into their second assault on the town by Russian built T-26 tanks. Belchite was a hard battle with house-to-house fighting that produced heavy casualties.

After Belchite the XVth Brigade was again reorganized. The newly formed Canadian MacKenzie-Papineau Battalion joined the brigade and the veteran Dimitrov Battalion departed. A majority of the volunteers in the "Mac-Paps" were actually Americans. On October 13, 1937, the XVth Brigade fought at Fuentes de Ebro. Men from the brigade's 24th (Spanish) Battalion rode Russian tanks into the attack. The remaining battalions were supposed to follow the tanks, but the attack fell apart as the tanks did not coordinate their advance with the infantry. Casualties were especially heavy in the 24th and MacKenzie-Papineau Battalions. After Fuentes the XVth Brigade was pulled back to a reserve position where it received its first extended period of rest and relaxation since going into combat at Jarama.

In late December the Lincoln-Washington Battalion was alerted for service at Teruel. The XVth Brigade was deployed to hold the recently captured city of Teruel against the expected Nationalist counterattack. The winter of 1937/38 was among the coldest on record, and many troops suffered frostbite during the campaign. The Lincoln-Washington's initially held positions overlooking Teruel that they called the North Pole. Later they moved down into the city. During January, the Nationalists launched coordinated attacks against the Republican defenses. The XVth Brigade's British Battalion and MacKenzie-Papineau Battalion both lost an entire company attempting to hold the territory. Nationalist superiority in both numbers and materiel eventually pushed the XVth Brigade out of Teruel. The XV BDE, including the Lincoln-Washington Battalion, were pulled out of the line for rest after three weeks in the lines. But before the units could get to the rest areas, their trains and trucks were stopped and they were re-deployed to the front where they participated in an offensive that was expected to relieve some of the pressure on Teruel. In a dawn attack the XVth Brigade attacked a series of Nationalist fortifications at Segura de los Baños. While the attack was a success, the Nationalist forces did not transfer any forces away from Teruel.

1938-1939

March found the Lincoln-Washington in reserve positions in Aragon. Their rest proved short-lived as the XVth Brigade was swept up in the disaster known as The Retreats. Nationalist forces punched through the Republican lines and drove to the sea, cutting the Republic in two. The Lincoln-Washington Battalion was dispersed, reformed and dispersed again in a confused series of holding actions and retreats in which it lost most of its personnel killed, captured or missing. Robert Merriman and Dave Doran, two of the highest ranking American officers in the XVth Brigade, were presumed captured and executed as Nationalist forces normally executed all international prisoners. The remnants of the Battalion gathered on the far side of the Ebro River, where they were slowly reconstituted with a limited number of international volunteers from the hospitals and rear areas.

Spanish troops, many young conscripts, were drafted into the XVth Brigade's battalions to bring them fully up to strength. Spaniards were integrated into the Lincoln Battalion as early as Jarama. As the flow of volunteers decreased from North America, Spanish companies were added to the international battalions. After the Retreats, Spanish troops were integrated across all of the battalions and comprised the majority of the XVth Brigade's strength in its last action.

In July 1938, the rebuilt Lincoln-Washington Battalion participated in the Ebro offensive. The XVth Brigade crossed the Ebro and rapidly advanced across territory they had retreated through in March and April. However, the Nationalist forces quickly rallied and the offensive stalled. The Republicans forces changed back to the defensive, contesting the area that had been captured in the offensive. 

On September 21, 1938 Juan Negrín, the Spanish prime minister, announced to the League of Nations the unilateral withdrawal of the International Brigades from battle. Juan Negrín , was trying to negotiate peace as his only last hope. He had been informed that the International Brigades were no longer of military value and he had the vain hope that the Nationalists would withdraw their German and Italian troops in turn. Franco would keep his Italian and German forces until the end of the war.

On November 1, 1938, International Brigadists received a warm farewell from the people in the city of Barcelona, where 250,000 people gathered to goodbye the international brigades for freedom. In a famous farewell speech, Dolores Ibárruri Pasionària declared "You are history, you are legend, you are the heroic example of solidarity and the universality of democracy".

Surviving Americans from across Spain were sent to Ripoll, where the International Red Cross and the US government verified their nationality before repatriating them. Many were able to participate in the farewell activities, including a parade in Barcelona where the International Brigades were officially disbanded. Most American volunteers returned to the US between December 1938 and January 1939. American POWs were released after the fall of the Republican government, although the last POWs did not arrive in the United States until September 1939.

Composition
The Lincoln Battalion and its successor the Lincoln-Washington Battalion was manned by 3,015 Americans.  While several of these volunteers also held citizenship in other countries, they identified primarily as Americans.  Approximately 1,681 of these men also served in the Mackenzie-Papineau ("Mac-Pap") Battalion as heavy losses in both battalions led to mergers and transfers of men.

Many of the volunteers were either first or second-generation immigrants, and the battalion was overwhelmingly white.  The average age of Americans who served in the Lincoln brigade was 27. Still, there were soldiers who arrived at the age of 16. Volunteers came from 46 out of 48 states in the United States with New York City providing the single largest amount of recruits with 1/5th to 1/3rd being of or formerly from the city prior to going to Spain. Most of the volunteers who could speak Spanish were from either New York City or Ybor City located in Tampa, Florida.

Americans who applied were screened by the Communist Party USA with an in person interview by a special committee. They would try to eliminate those who they believed "...lacked a political understanding of the anti-fascist struggle." and adventurers. In the Communist Party, joining the  brigade was never mandatory. Secrecy was a high priority and volunteers were only given minimal information by party leaders and only got information regarding their passports when they had passed their examination. The committee recommended volunteers give false information about where they were travelling.

Americans usually entered Spain by first emigrating to France because the United States Government was not issuing visas to Spain as part of its non-intervention policy.  Few American volunteers arrived after September 1937.

Battalion members fought for many different reasons. For the 85 African-American members of the battalion, the National forces represented some of the injustices they faced back in the US. The Nationalist army largely consisted of colonial troops from Spain's African colonies or of conscripted blacks who were desperate to escape poverty. Furthermore, Franco was supported by the Italian army and air force, which had only recently conquered the African nation of Ethiopia. Several leaders characterized the war as a crusade against the "Africanization" of Spain despite the fact that it was the Nationalists who relied on African fighters. Langston Hughes, a journalist for the Baltimore Afro-American at the time, wrote, "Give Franco a hood and he would be a member of the Ku Klux Klan." Though the Lincoln Battalion was largely white, it was integrated.

Most of the original volunteers in the battalion were communists or Soviet sympathizers. It is difficult to list exactly how many members of the battalion were communists because political ideology was not a litmus test for serving in the war. Historians and veterans of the battalion estimate that between 50 and 80% of the battalion were actively communist. It is certain though that the vast majority of the commanding officers were communists. Unlike most of their European counterparts, the Americans in the International Brigade were much more likely to be students and to not have ever seen military service before the war.

Not all combatants were motivated by ideological or political concerns. As Mo Fishman, a veteran of the battalion, recalled in 2006, "Some men were running away from bad marital or love situations, but what united all of us was that we hated fascism." Anti-fascism, more than any other single factor, is what motivated and united the volunteers of the Lincoln Battalion.

Other American units

20th Battalion, 86th Brigade
An American company served in the 20th International Battalion that was attached to the 86th Mixed Brigade. This unit fought on the Cordoba Front. Most of the American volunteers were transferred from the unit to the XVth Brigade prior to the Brunete Offensive.

The George Washington Battalion
The Washington Battalion was the second American battalion. The unit was merged with the Lincoln Battalion during the Brunete Campaign. It was commanded by Mirko Marković and its commissar was Dave Mates.

The MacKenzie-Papineau Battalion
Two-thirds of the nominally Canadian unit were Americans. Its first commander was Robert Thompson, an American veteran of the Lincoln Battalion. Joseph Dallet, also American, was the first Commissar.

2nd Squadron, First Regiment de Tren
The Regiment de Tren was a transportation unit providing support to the Republican forces. The Second Squadron was predominately American. The commander was Durward Clark.

The John Brown Battery

This unit's official title was the 14th Battery, 2nd Group, 11th Regiment. It was a heavy artillery unit manning 155mm guns. The battery commander was Arthur Timpson, with Jack Waters as Commissar.

4th Group, 35th Battery
This unit initially manned 155mm guns but were later equipped with 45mm anti-tank guns and were included in the 129th International Brigade. The battery commander was Nathan Budish, and his Commissar was Sid Kaufman.

American Medical Bureau

Organized by Dr. Edward K. Barsky, the American Medical Bureau (AMB) recruited doctors, dentists, nurses, administrators and ambulance drivers to support the Spanish Republic. In its fund raising events the names 'American Medical Bureau to Save Spanish Democracy' and 'Medical Bureau & North American Committee to Aid Spanish Democracy' were also used.

In the United States the AMB staged events in order to try to shift public opinion away from supporting the aid boycott to the Spanish Republic imposed by the American government following the agreements of the Non-intervention Committee. In Spain the AMB was assigned to hospitals and medical centers of the Spanish Military Medical Services (Cuerpo de Sanidad), such as the Gómez Ulla Military Hospital in Madrid, and also to front-line locations. AMB members, who also included women, treated both international as well as Spanish combatants.

By the end of the war a majority of both the Spanish aid committees and the leadership councils of the AMB were women. Many women leaders in the aid movement were wives of either prominent American leftists or soldiers in the Lincoln Battalion. Katherine Duncan, wife to Governor La Follette's secretary, and Peggy Dennis, a communist party leader, were leaders in the active Madison, Wisconsin chapter. Marion Merriman, wife to Abraham Lincoln Battalion commander Robert Merriman (the supposed inspiration of Hemingway's hero in For Whom the Bell Tolls), was the chairwoman of the large San Francisco branch of the organization. She and one other woman, Fredericka Martin, hold the honor of being the only woman to receive officer commissions from the Spanish Republic. Evelyn Hutchins, an active member of the AMB, agitated for years to be a hospital driver on the front-lines, but Spanish Republican policies prevented women from serving on the front-line until 1938 when Hutchins won the right to serve on the front-line as a driver.

Aftermath
During and after the Spanish Civil War, members of the brigade were generally viewed as supporters of the Soviet Union. After returning to the United States, many joined the Veterans of the Abraham Lincoln Brigade (VALB). However, the Molotov–Ribbentrop Pact caused a division among the Lincoln Brigade veterans. Some of them, adopting the official Communist line, joined with the American Peace Mobilization in protesting American support for Britain and France against Nazi Germany. Others, however, persisted with the anti-Fascist line which they had followed to Spain. After the German invasion of the Soviet Union, the VALB changed its stance and fully backed the war. Former Lincoln-Washington commander Milton Wolff volunteered in 1940 for the British Special Operations Executive, and arranged the provision of arms for the European resistance organizations.

During the Second World War, the U.S. government considered former members of the brigade to be security risks. In fact, FBI Director J. Edgar Hoover requested that President Roosevelt ensure that former ALB members fighting in U.S. Forces in World War II not be considered for commissioning as officers, or to have any type of positive distinction conferred upon them. In 1947, the veterans of the Abraham Lincoln Brigade were placed on the Attorney General's List of Subversive Organizations. The veterans would be one of only five groups that would stay intact, to at least 1970, after receiving this designation.

Once the US entered World War II, the Federal Bureau of Investigation recommended that all veterans of the Lincoln Battalion be denied military promotion so as to prevent communists from rising in the armed forces. After World War II ended, veterans of the Lincoln Battalion were denied military enlistment and government jobs. The House Un-American Activities Committee blacklisted the names of all veterans of the Lincoln Battalion. Veterans were also fired, spied upon, harassed, labeled communists to employers, denied housing and refused passports for decades. The FBI has denied that it maintained any files on the veterans of the Lincoln Battalion, but veterans groups claim that the federal government is merely covering up its crimes.

The last known surviving member of the Lincoln Battalion, Delmer Berg, died on February 28, 2016, at the age of 100.

In 1985 in an interview with Scripps-Howard editors, President Ronald Reagan said that most Americans believed that their fellow Americans who fought with the Loyalist forces were on the wrong side.

Anthem: "Valley of Jarama"

Members of the XV International Brigade adapted a song by Alex McDade to reflect the losses at the Battle of Jarama. Sung to the tune of the traditional country song Red River Valley, it became their anthem.

Members

Lincoln Battalion commanding officers
 James Harris
 Robert Hale Merriman
 Martin Hourihan
 Oliver Law
 Mirko Markovics
 Steve Nelson
 Hans Amlie
 Leonard Lamb
 Phil Detro
 David Morris Reiss
 Aaron Lopoff
 Milton Wolff

Lincoln Battalion commissars
 Phil Bard
 George Brodsky
 Archie Brown
 Dave Doran
 David E. Jones
 Fred Keller
 Fred Lutz
 Steve Nelson
 Harry Haywood (Regimental Commissar)
 John Q. Robinson
 Sam Stember
 George Watt

Other notable members

 James Walker Benét – Author and journalist (San Francisco Chronicle).
 Alvah Bessie – Hollywood screenwriter who was one of the Hollywood Ten.
 Delmer Berg – Union organizer.
 Herman Bottcher – Earned two Distinguished Service Crosses in World War II.
 Edward A. Carter, Jr. – Earned the Medal of Honor in World War II.
 Carmelo Delgado Delgado – Puerto Rican nationalist, among the first U.S. citizens to die in the war.
 Leo Eloesser – Noted US thoracic surgeon.
 Moe Fishman – co-founder and executive secretary/treasurer of the Veterans of the Abraham Lincoln Brigade.
 John Gates – Political commissar of the battalion, later editor of The Daily Worker.
 Robert Klonsky – One of the defendants in the Smith Act trial of the mid-1950s.
 Conlon Nancarrow – Composer.
 George Sossenko – Also fought in the Durruti Column.
 Robert G. Thompson – Awarded the Distinguished Service Cross in World War II; among the 1950s Smith Act trial defendants.
 Harry Wayland Randall – Chief photographer of the Photographic Unit of the 15th International Brigade.
 William Herrick – Novelist.
 William Lindsay Gresham – Novelist and non-fiction author particularly well-regarded among readers of noir.
 Eddie Balchowsky – Artist, poet, & pianist, and inspiration for Jimmy Buffett song "He Went to Paris".

Recognition

Memorials and awards
 Currently, there are four memorials dedicated to the veterans of the Abraham Lincoln Brigade.
 The first is located on the campus of the University of Washington in Seattle.
 The second is located in James Madison Park in Madison, Wisconsin.
 A third memorial to the veterans of the Abraham Lincoln Brigade was dedicated on the Embarcadero in San Francisco, California on March 30, 2008. Among the speakers were San Francisco mayor Gavin Newsom and a few of the several ALB veterans still living.
 The fourth memorial commemorates the students and faculty of The City College of New York (CCNY) who fought in the Spanish Civil War, including the thirteen alumni who died in that war. The memorial is located in the North Academic Center of CCNY.

In museums
In 2007, the exhibit Facing Fascism: New York and the Spanish Civil War at the Museum of the City of New York examined the role that New Yorkers played in the conflict, as well as the political and social ideologies that motivated them to participate in activities ranging from rallying support, fundraising, and relief aid, to fighting—and sometimes dying—on the front lines in Spain.

See also

 International Brigades order of battle
 Irish Socialist Volunteers in the Spanish Civil War
 Jewish volunteers in the Spanish Civil War
 Polish volunteers in the Spanish Civil War
 Songs of the Lincoln Battalion
 Spanish Republican Air Force
 Spanish Republican Army
 Yankee Squadron

Notes

References

Citations

Works cited

 
 Goldstein, Robert Justin (2009). American Blacklist: The Attorney General's List of Subversive Organizations. Lawrence: University Press of Kansas.

Further reading

 Beevor, Antony. The Battle for Spain, 2006.
 Bermack, Richard. The Front Lines of Social Change: Veterans of the Abraham Lincoln Brigade, Heyday Books, 2005.
 Bradley, Ken International Brigades in Spain 1936–39 with Mike Chappell (Illustrator) Published by Elite. .
 Brandt, Joe (Ed.). Black Americans In The Spanish People's War Against Fascism 1936–1939. New York: Veterans Abraham Lincoln Brigade, no date, ca. 1979.
 Carroll, Peter N. The Odyssey of the Abraham Lincoln Brigade, Stanford: Stanford University Press, 1994.
 
 Eby, Cecil.  Between the Bullet and the Lie: American Volunteers in the Spanish Civil War, New York: Holt, Rinehart & Winston, 1969.
 Eby, Cecil. Comrades and Commissars, University Park: The Pennsylvania State University Press, 2007.
 Geiser, Carl. Prisoners of the Good Fight, Westport, CT: Lawrence Hill and Company, 1986.
 Glazer, Peter. Radical Nostalgia: Spanish Civil War Commemoration in America. New York: University of Rochester Press, 2005.
 Hochschild, Adam. "Spain in Our Hearts: Americans in the Spanish Civil War, 1936-1939" Houghton Mifflin Harcourt, 2016
 Johnson, Verle B. Legions of Babel, University Park: The Pennsylvania State University Press, 1967.
 Orwell, George. Homage to Catalonia, 1938.
 Osheroff, Abraham. "Dreams and Nightmares", 1974.
 Rolfe, Edwin. The Lincoln Battalion: The Story of the Americans Who Fought in Spain in the International Brigades, New York: Random House, 1939.
 Rosenstone, Robert A. Crusade of the Left, New York: Pegasus, 1969.
 Thomas, Hugh. The Spanish Civil War, 4th Rev. Ed. 2001.
 Yates, James. Mississippi to Madrid: Memoir of a Black American in the Abraham Lincoln Brigade.  Seattle: Open Hand Publishing, 1989.

Suggested listening
 Songs of the Spanish Civil War Vol. 2: Songs of the Lincoln Brigade (Folkways) (1962)
 Songs of the Lincoln and International Brigades (Stinson) (1962)

External links

 The Volunteer, the quarterly journal of the Abraham Lincoln Brigade Archives
 The ALBA Blog
 Some Men Put Up Their Lives
 Columbia Historical Review Dutch Involvement in the Spanish Civil War
 List of Abraham Lincoln Brigade Volunteers New York University Robert F. Wagner Labor Archives
 Online guide to the archives of the Lincoln Brigade, Tamiment Library (New York).
 Finding Aid to the Veterans of the Abraham Lincoln Brigade, Bay Area Post records, 1928–1995 (bulk 1937–1988), The Bancroft Library
 Fighting Fascism: The Americans – Women and Men – Who Fought In the Spanish Civil War (Democracy Now! show, aired April 30, 2007)
 FBI monograph: Summary Memorandum on The Veterans of The Abraham Lincoln Brigade 1937 – 1948
 McArdle, Joe. The Spanish Civil War and the Pacific Northwest, Great Depression in Washington State Project.
 Stuyvesant's Spanish Civil War Archives

African-American history of the United States military
Communism in the United States
Communist Party USA
Military units and formations established in 1936
International Brigades
Spain–United States relations
 
Military units and formations disestablished in 1938